The Storming of the Teocalli by Cortez and His Troops is an 1848 oil on canvas painting by the German American history painter, Emanuel Leutze.

Background
The painting is based on William H. Prescott's description of events in his 1843 book, History of the Conquest of Mexico. It was painted in Düsseldorf, Germany in 1848 and first exhibited in New York City in 1849, at a time when some believed it to be a commentary on the recent Mexican American War.  In 1991 the painting was exhibited at the Smithsonian American Art Museum in Washington D.C. in The West as America Art Exhibition and brewed up new discussion as to whose side it takes in the conflict.
 

Today the work is displayed as part of the permanent collection of the Wadsworth Atheneum in Hartford, Connecticut.

References

Paintings by Emanuel Leutze
War paintings
History paintings
Paintings in Mexico

1848 paintings
Cultural depictions of Hernán Cortés